Laplante may refer to:

Laplante (surname)
LaPlante, New Brunswick, Canada, settlement
La Plant, South Dakota, U.S., census-designated place

See also
Plante (disambiguation)